Anna Oreg (born 28 December 1985) is a Serbian veterinarian and politician who has been a member of the National Assembly since 1 August 2022. She is a president of the Vojvodina branch of the Movement of Free Citizens (PSG).

Biography 
Oreg was born to a Hungarian family on 28 December 1985 in Novi Sad, SAP Vojvodina, SR Serbia, SFR Yugoslavia. During her youth, she was engaged in show jumping. She graduated from the Faculty of Agriculture, majoring in veterinary medicine.

She gained practical knowledge in the profession at the veterinary clinic "Szögedi ló és kisállat ambulancia" in Hungary. She worked as a one-year trainee in the private veterinary clinic "NS Vet" in Novi Sad. After that, she was employed for two years at the "Nelt" company, in the newly opened pet division. She worked on the formation of a network of customers in the territory of Vojvodina. She obtained her license by passing the professional exam in 2012. Since 2012, she is the owner of the private veterinary clinic "Dog House", where she deals with professional practice and professional training of graduated veterinarians.

Political career 
She has been a member of the Movement of Free Citizens (PSG) since April 2019. She was elected as the president of the Vojvodina branch of PSG by a majority of votes on 27 September 2020.

In the 2022 general election, PSG contested as part of the United for the Victory of Serbia alliance and Oreg was elected MP.

Personal life 
She is married and has one child.

References 

1985 births
Living people
Hungarians in Vojvodina
Serbian people of Hungarian descent
Movement of Free Citizens (Serbia) politicians
Members of the National Assembly (Serbia)